Borton is an unincorporated community in Embarrass Township, Edgar County, Illinois, United States.

Notable person
Robert F. Casey, Illinois state legislator and lawyer, was born in Borton.

References

Unincorporated communities in Edgar County, Illinois
Unincorporated communities in Illinois